is a lava dome located in the Nipesotsu-Maruyama Volcanic Group of the Ishikari Mountains, Hokkaido, Japan.

References

External links
 Geographical Survey Institute

Mountains of Hokkaido
Volcanoes of Hokkaido
Lava domes